The House at 39 Converse Street in Wakefield, Massachusetts, United States, is a well-preserved Queen Anne Victorian house.  It was built c. 1880 as part of a real estate development along Converse Street.  It is a -story wood-frame structure, with a hip roof and cross gable.  It features decorative shingle bands in sections on the second floor, and between the first and second floors. The L-shaped house has a second story projecting gabled section over a rounded projecting bay on the first floor.

The house was listed on the National Register of Historic Places in 1989.

See also
National Register of Historic Places listings in Wakefield, Massachusetts
National Register of Historic Places listings in Middlesex County, Massachusetts

References

Houses in Wakefield, Massachusetts
Houses on the National Register of Historic Places in Wakefield, Massachusetts
Queen Anne architecture in Massachusetts
Houses completed in 1880